Sasan is a 2nd-century ancestor of the Iranian House of Sasan.

Sasan or Sassan may also refer to:

People 
 House of Sasan, ruled the Sasanian Empire from 224 to 651
 Sasan V, a mythological character from the Dasatir
 Sasan (Apraca) (45–50 CE), Indo-Scythian king
 Sasan Ansari (born 1991), Iranian footballer
 Sassan Behnam-Bakhtiar (born 1984), Iranian-French multidisciplinary artist
 Sasan Hosseini (born 1999), Iranian footballer
 Sassan Sanei (born 1973), Canadian engineer
 Loveleen Kaur Sasan (born 1990), Indian actress

Places 
 Sasan (land grant), a tax-free royal fief given to the Charanas
 Sasan, Una, a village in Una district, Himachal Pradesh, India
 Sasan Castle, a fortress in Qazvin province, Iran
 Sasan Gir, a forest, national park, and wildlife sanctuary in Gujarat, India
 Sasan Ultra Mega Power Project, Singrauli district, Madhya Pradesh, India

See also
 Sazan Island, Albania, in the Mediterranean
 Sasanian Empire